Euphaedra margueriteae is a butterfly in the family Nymphalidae. It is found in the Democratic Republic of the Congo (Kivu), Rwanda and Uganda.

References

Butterflies described in 1978
margueriteae